Phuopsis is a genus of flowering plants belonging to the family Rubiaceae.

Its native range is Caucasus to Northwestern Iran.

Species
Species:
 Phuopsis stylosa (Trin.) G.Nicholson

References

Rubiaceae
Rubiaceae genera